Aimard is a surname. Notable people with the surname include:

 Pierre-Laurent Aimard (born 1957), French pianist
 Gustave Aimard, (1818–1883), French author